The Cherrytree Sessions may refer to:

 The Cherrytree Sessions (Lady Gaga EP), 2009
 The Cherrytree Sessions, an EP by Robyn, 2009
 The Cherrytree Sessions, an EP by Keane, 2009
 The Cherrytree Sessions, an EP by Matthew Koma, 2013